Confederation Suburban Development Area (SDA) is an area in Saskatoon, Saskatchewan (Canada).  It is a part of the west side community of Saskatoon.  It lies (generally) north of the outskirts of the City and the Rural Municipality of Corman Park No. 344, west of downtown Saskatoon, and the Core Neighbourhoods SDA, south of the North West Industrial SDA, and east of the new Blairmore SDA.

Neighbourhoods 

 AgPro Industrial
 Confederation Park
 Confederation Suburban Centre
 Dundonald
 Fairhaven
 Hampton Village
 Holiday Park
 Hudson Bay Park
 Massey Place
 Meadowgreen
 Montgomery Place
 Mount Royal
 Pacific Heights
 Parkridge
 South West Industrial
 West Industrial
 Westview

Recreation facilities
 Cosmo Civic Centre & Ice Arena

Shopping
 Confederation Park Mall
 Pleasant Hill Plaza
 Westgate Plaza
 Westgreen Plaza

See also
 List of shopping malls in Saskatoon

Education 
Confederation SDA is home to the following schools:

Separate education

Secondary schools
 E. D. Feehan High School

Elementary schools
 St. Edward School
 École Henry Kelsey
 St. Mary Community School

Public education

Secondary schools
 Bedford Road Collegiate
 Mount Royal Collegiate
 Mount Royal West

Secondary Schools of Saskatoon

Elementary schools
 College Park School
 Confederation Park School
 Fairhaven School
 Howard Coad School
 King George School
 Pleasant Hill School
 W.P. Bate School

Library
Carlyle King Branch

Transportation 
22nd Street (Highway 14) is a major thoroughfare through Saskatoon  Highway 14 connects with Asquith, Biggar Wilkie, Unity, and Macklin en route to Alberta. The Circle Drive ring road also passes through the area.

City transit
The following routes serve the area, all meeting at the bus terminal at Confederation Mall.
 1 Westview – Wildwood
 2 Meadowgreen – 8th Street
 3 Riversdale – College Park
 4 Dundonald – Willowgrove
 5 Fairhaven – Briarwood
 22 City Centre – McCormack
 23 Hampton Village – Shaw Centre
 50 Pacific Heights – Lakeview
 60 Confederation – Lakeridge

Location

References

External links 
 City of Saskatoon City of Saskatoon · Departments · Community Services · City Planning · ZAM Maps
 Populace Spring 2006

Neighbourhoods in Saskatoon